Tamara Talbot Rice (19 June 1904 – 24 September 1993) was a Russian then English art historian, writing on Byzantine, Russian, and Central Asian art.

Talbot Rice was born Elena Abelson, to Louisa Elizabeth ("Lifa") Vilenkin and Israel Boris Abelevich Abelson, the latter a businessman and member of the Czar's financial administration. Leo Tolstoy was her godfather. Elena lived a privileged childhood in St Petersburg, initially attending Tagantzeva Girls' School. The Russian Revolution of 1917 prompted her family to move to England, and she completed her schooling, first at Cheltenham Ladies' College and then at St Hugh's College, Oxford.

In 1927 she married the English art historian David Talbot Rice, and spent much time travelling abroad with him on archaeological digs; they both published under the surname Talbot Rice, but are often referred to as "Talbot-Rice" or "Rice". She was a close friend of Evelyn Waugh and formed part of the 'Brideshead Revisited Circle'.

She died in 1993 and was buried next to her husband in the churchyard of St Andrew's, Coln Rogers.

Publications (selected)
 1959: Icons, London: Batchworth Press (revised edition 1960).
 1963: A Concise History of Russian Art, 'The World of Art Library' series. London: Thames and Hudson.
 1965: Ancient Arts of Central Asia, 'The World of Art Library' series. London: Thames and Hudson.
 1970: Elizabeth, Empress of Russia, London: Weidenfeld & Nicolson.

References

1904 births
1993 deaths
Russian art historians
English art historians
Russian women historians
Women art historians
20th-century English historians
Emigrants from the Russian Empire to the United Kingdom
Alumni of St Hugh's College, Oxford
Historians of Byzantine art
Women Byzantinists
Women medievalists
20th-century British women writers